The Royal Basilica of Saint Francis the Great is a Roman Catholic church in central Madrid, Spain, located in the neighborhood of Palacio.

The main façade faces the Plaza of San Francisco, at the intersection of Bailén, the Gran Vía de San Francisco, and the Carrera de San Francisco. It forms part of the convent of Jesús y María of the Franciscan order. The convent was founded in the 13th century at the site of a chapel.

The building was erected on the plot previously occupied by a primitive Franciscan convent (according to tradition founded by the very same Francis of Assisi in 1217), demolished on the occasion upon orders by Charles III, who sought to build a new convent from scratch.
It was designed in a Neoclassic style in the second half of the 18th century, based on a design by Francisco Cabezas, developed by Antonio Pló, and completed by Francesco Sabatini. The church contains paintings by Zurbarán and Francisco Goya. The walls of the temple was painted in the 19th century. The temple once functioned as the National pantheon and enshrined the remains of famous artists and politicians. Today is an important tourism point.

It is reportedly the fourth biggest dome in Europe after the Pantheon, St. Peter's Basilica and the Florence cathedral.

The temple was elevated to the status of minor basilica via an edict issued by John XXIII on 2 February 1963, the apostolic letter Gloria matriti.

In 1980, the building was designated as national historic-artistic monument (a heritage status predating in time that of the bien de interés cultural) by the Ministry of Culture.

Bells 
Although unringable they were the only peal of change ringing church bells in mainland Europe until 2017, when St George's Church in Ypres received a peal of their own.

See also 
Catholic Church in Spain
List of oldest church buildings

References 

18th-century Roman Catholic church buildings in Spain
Francisco
Neoclassical architecture in Madrid
Bien de Interés Cultural landmarks in Madrid
Church buildings with domes
Buildings and structures in Palacio neighborhood, Madrid
Neoclassical church buildings in Spain